The badger game is an extortion scheme or confidence trick in which the victims are tricked into compromising positions in order to make them vulnerable to blackmail. Its name is derived from the practice of badger baiting.

The trick was particularly effective in the 19th and earlier 20th century when social attitudes toward adultery were much harsher. A famous person known to have fallen victim of the scheme was the first United States Secretary of the Treasury, Alexander Hamilton, whose adulterous affair with Maria Reynolds was used by her husband to extort money and information from him.

The badger game has been featured as a plot device in numerous books, movies and television shows.

Description
In its simplest form, the badger game proceeds thus: A married man begins an extramarital affair. Another man, posing as the other woman's husband or brother, then "discovers" the affair; he then demands money from the man to keep the affair secret. Unknown to the man having the affair, both the woman and the man who demands the money had prearranged the situation and were conspiring against him.

The woman may also claim that the sexual encounter was non-consensual and threaten the victim with a rape or sexual harassment charge.

Variants of the trick involve luring the victim with the promise of a homosexual act, underage children, child pornography, a bizarre sexual fetish, or some other activity carrying a legal penalty and/or social stigma. In the most typical form of the trick, an attractive woman approaches a man, preferably a lonely married man of considerable financial means from out of town, and entices him to a private place with the intent of maneuvering him into a compromising position, usually sexual. Afterwards, an accomplice blackmails the victim with photographs or similar evidence.

Another form involves accusations of professional misconduct. In an example of this form of the trick, a "sick" woman visits a physician, describing symptoms that require her to disrobe for the examination, require the doctor to examine the genitals, or ensure similar scrutiny from the doctor. During the examination an "outraged husband" or "outraged father" enters the room and accuses the doctor of misconduct. The "sick" woman, who is of course part of the deception, takes the side of her accomplice and threatens the doctor with criminal charges or a lawsuit. This form of the badger game was first widely publicized in an article in the August 25, 1930, edition of Time magazine.

Non-sexual versions of this trick also exist, particularly among ethnic and religious groups with strong social taboos, for example inducing a Mormon to gamble or drink alcohol in violation of his religious vows, and then demanding money to keep the indulgence secret and thus preserve his reputation.

See also
Clip joint
Entrapment
Hamilton–Reynolds sex scandal
"The Medicine Man"
Romance scam

References 

Blackmail
Confidence tricks